Limetree can refer to:
 Tilia, genus of lime trees
 Limetree Records, subsidiary of Timeless Records